Spoken Word is a 2009 drama film directed by Victor Nuñez and starring Kuno Becker, Ruben Blades, Miguel Sandoval and Persia White.

The writers include William T. Conway and Joe Ray Sandoval. The film was produced by Karen Koch and William T. Conway. It opened in New York City at Big Cinemas Manhattan 1 on July 23, 2010, and played in Los Angeles at Laemmle's Sunset 5 on July 30, 2010.

Plot
 
Cruz Montoya is a Latino spoken-word artist who works in San Francisco. He returns home to Santa Fe, New Mexico to reconnect with his dying father and his brother. He is finding himself losing his "voice" as he spirals downward back into the dysfunctional life of drugs and violence he had left behind.

His brother is judgmental. Cruz is approached by his former boss Emilio, who works as a local drug dealer. Cruz falls into the familiar patterns of his past while ignoring the increasingly anxious phone calls of his girlfriend. Cruz is also suffering from bipolar disorder and uses alcohol to self-medicate.

Cast
Kuno Becker as Cruz Montoya
Ruben Blades as Senior
Miguel Sandoval as Emilio
Persia White as Shae
Rashaan Nall as Cloudy
Chris Ranney as Bartender

Reception
On review aggregator website Rotten Tomatoes the film has a score of 46% based on reviews from 13 critics, with an average rating of 5.4/10. On Metacritic, Spoken Word have a rank of 56 out of a 100 based on 13 critics, indicating "mixed or average reviews".

Nick Schager of Slant Magazine gave the film one star out of 4, while Roger Ebert of the Chicago Sun-Times gave it 3 out of 4 and called Spoken Word "A rich and textured film".

References

External links

Spoken Word at ComingSoon.net
Spoken Word at Yahoo! Movies
Spoken Word at IMP Awards

2009 drama films
2009 films
Films scored by Michael Brook
Films about bipolar disorder
Films about poets
Films set in New Mexico
Hispanic and Latino American drama films
Variance Films films
Films directed by Victor Nuñez
2000s English-language films
2000s American films